Æthelswith (c. 838–888) was the only known daughter of King Æthelwulf of Wessex. She married King Burgred of Mercia in 853. The couple had no known issue.

Her marriage probably signaled the subordination of Burgred to his father-in-law and the Saxon kingdom at a time when both Wessex and Mercia were suffering Danish (Viking) raids. Burgred also had ongoing problems with the Kingdom of Powys on his western border and in 853 Æthelwulf subjugated the Welsh state on Burgred's behalf.

Although it is unclear to what extent, Æthelswith wielded some power as a queen in her own right. In 868 she witnessed a West Saxon charter and made a grant of fifteen hides of land in her own name in Berkshire, rare for a queen of the period to do so. One item that is believed to have been hers, a gold ring inlaid with niello, inscribed with the words Æthelswith Regina, survives in the British Museum. Given the large size of the ring, it is more likely that she was the giver of the ring, rather than the wearer.

Repeated Danish incursions over the years gradually weakened Mercia militarily and in 868 Burgred was forced to call upon Æthelswith's brother King Æthelred of Wessex to assist him in confronting an entrenched Danish army at Nottingham. This was the last time the Saxons came to the aid of the Mercians and is also notable as the occasion on which Alfred the Great, another brother of Æthelswith's, married his Mercian wife Ealhswith.

Burgred's reign lasted till 874 when the Vikings drove him from the kingdom and he fled to Rome with Æthelswith. He died shortly after. Æthelswith lived on in Italy for another decade, before dying while on a pilgrimage in Pavia in 888 and was buried in the monastery of San Felice.

References

Further reading
On Æthelswith's ring see:

External links
 

9th-century English women

9th-century English people

830s births

888 deaths
Year of birth uncertain
Anglo-Saxon royal consorts